The Sri Lankan long-tailed shrew (Crocidura miya) is a species of mammal in the family Soricidae. It is endemic to Sri Lanka. It is threatened by habitat loss.

Description
It is brown above with gray at the base of hairs and is colored slightly lighter below. The tail is brown and longer than the head and body combined.

References

Mammals of Sri Lanka
Crocidura
Mammals described in 1929
Taxonomy articles created by Polbot